Julian Paul Keenan (born December 8, 1969) is a  professor of biology at Montclair State University and director of the Cognitive Neuroimaging Laboratory. He was previously at Harvard Medical School and the Beth Israel Deaconess Medical Center in Boston.

Early life and education 
Keenan was born on December 8, 1969 in New York City. He was educated at State University of New York at New Paltz, The Pennsylvania State University, Ealing College, and Harvard Medical School between 1987 and 2001.

Career 
Keenan joined the faculty at Montclair State University in 2001 where he established the Cognitive Neuroimaging Laboratory. He was eventually named one of the 20 most impactful intelects in New Jersey.

He is the Founding Editor of the journal Social Neuroscience and has published his work in Science  and Nature.

He discovered that the brain correlates of self-face recognition are mediated in the right hemisphere. His lab further determined the critical role the medial prefrontal cortex plays in deception and self-deception.

He was an early adopter of transcranial magnetic stimulation for use in cognitive neuroscience and continues to employ it in his current research.

His work has reached the public through major media outlets including Radio Lab https://radiolab.org/episodes/91496-who-am-i and Hulu https://www.youtube.com/watch?v=xBKZ5rIQu28

Books 
He has authored and edited numerous books including:

 The Face in the Mirror (2004) 
 The Lost Self (2005) 
 ASVAB -The Best Test Prep (2005) 
 Evolutionary Cognitive Neuroscience (2006) 
 The Handbook of Research Methods in Health Psychology (2020)

References 

Living people
1969 births
Montclair State University alumni
Harvard Medical School alumni
Harvard Medical School faculty
Scientists from New York City
Pennsylvania State University alumni
Alumni of the University of West London
American neuroscientists